The 1981 Air Canada Silver Broom, the men's world curling championship, was held from at the Thompson Arena in London, Ontario, Canada.

Teams

Round-robin standings

Round-robin results

Draw 1

Draw 2

Draw 3

Draw 4

Draw 5

Draw 6

Draw 7

Draw 8

Draw 9

Playoffs

Semifinals

Final

External links

World Men's Curling Championship
Air Canada Silver Broom
International curling competitions hosted by Canada
Curling in Ontario
Air Canada Silver Broom
Air Canada Silver Broom
Sports competitions in London, Ontario